Wise Woman usually refers, often in the context of pre-modern European peasantry, to:
Folk healer
Midwife

Wise Woman may also refer to:

Ethnographic examples
 Wise woman among the Sami

Individuals
Gouyen, Apache for "wise woman", a 19th-century Native American figure
Agnes Sampson, known as the Wise Wife of Keith, involved in the North Berwick Witch Trials

In fiction
 A character in fantasy series The Wheel of Time

Other uses
 One of the cunning folk 
 A type of white witch
 Wise Old Man and Wise Old Woman, a Jungian archetype
 Crone, a literary archetype

See also

The Lost Princess (1875), a fairy tale novel by George MacDonald, first published as The Wise Woman: A Parable
The Wise Woman of Hoxton, a 17th-century play
Wise woman of Abel, an unnamed figure in the Hebrew Bible
Woman of Tekoa, also called a wise woman in the Hebrew Bible